RUAG Holding (originally Rüstungs Unternehmen Aktiengesellschaft; Joint Stock Defence Company) is a Swiss company specialising in aerospace engineering and the defence industry. Its headquarters are located in Bern, while it also has numerous production sites in Switzerland (Nyon, Aigle, Thun, Bern, Emmen, Altdorf, Zürich and Interlaken), Germany (Oberpfaffenhofen, Hamburg Wedel and Fürth), Sweden (Gothenburg, Linköping and Åmotfors), Hungary (Sirok, Eger),  Austria (Vienna, Berndorf) and United States (Tampa and Titusville), and sales companies in Australia, UK, France, Belgium, Brazil and Malaysia.

History

Background and initial years
During the 1990s, the government of Switzerland decided that the nation's military enterprises needed to be restructured, a view which led to the passing of the Federal Act on Federal Armaments Companies (FArmCA) in 1997. In accordance with this act, a new entity, known as RUAG Switzerland Ltd, was established to bring together four former state-run enterprises: SE Schweizerische Elektronikunternehmung AG, SF Schweizerische Unternehmung für Flugzeuge und Systeme AG, SM Schweizerische Munitionsunternehmung AG, and SW Schweizerische Unternehmung für Waffensysteme AG. Prior to this merger, these companies were comprehensively restructured with the intention of making them competitive commercial enterprises. RUAG formally commenced operations on 1 January 1999.

Even prior to its establishment, RUAG was confronted by a severe challenge in the form of dwindling orders from the Swiss Armed Forces due to post-Cold War defence cuts having greatly diminished military spending. Recognising its overdependence on the Swiss military, which initially accounted for 86 percent of RUAG's sales, the company adopted a long-term strategy of diversification, progressively expanding its activities in the military and civil sectors both inside Switzerland and on the global market. This expansion went beyond only organic growth, necessitating numerous acquisitions, often focused in specific fields, such as aircraft and helicopter maintenance, repair and overhaul (MRO); command, information and communication systems; simulation and training systems; and small-calibre ammunition.

Positive results were soon achieved. During 2000, RUAG's Aerospace division reported 39 per cent growth in sales on the third-party market, which were generated from various programmes of aircraft manufacturers, including Airbus, Boeing and Pilatus. Other business included MRO services to foreign Northrop F-5 fighter aircraft, repair work on AIM-9 Sidewinder missiles for the United States Air Force and production of payload fairings for the US's Atlas V launch vehicle. RUAG's Land Systems division was also had optimism in the civilian sector, performing component assembly for injection moulding machines used in compact disc  production. By the end of 2001, RUAG had reached a turning point, reporting 8 per cent overall growth for that financial year despite a sustained decline in the domestic defence sector; these gains were achieved upon the international market, particularly within the civilian sector.

RUAG was negatively impacted by the Great Recession that started during 2008, soon thereafter reporting a significant drop in orders from the civilian sector, particularly for aerostructures and MRO services, as well as its automotive and semiconductor interests. Consolidated profit was hit by CHF 160 million of write-downs, causing a negative EBIT of CHF 113 million – the first deficit recorded in RUAG's operational history. Around this time, RUAG made a strategic move into the space industry, which had been previously a tiny area of the business. In 2008, it acquired Saab Space and its subsidiary Austrian Aerospace; during the following year, RUAG also bought the Oerlikon Space AG, and subsequently created its RUAG Space division, Europe's largest independent space supplier.

2010s
By 2010, RUAG's aviation division comprised three core areas: military MRO, business aviation, and special mission aircraft; of these, business aviation reportedly suffered a downturn following the Great Recession. The company made efforts to bolster its business aviation activities, focusing on providing MRO services to end users. In 2019, RUAG decided to sell its business aviation facilities in Geneva and Lugano to Dassault Aviation; the company stated that it was part of a strategic alignment, instead concentrating resources on its aerostructures and space programmes.

RUAG has progressively expanded the range of military aircraft that it provides MRO services for. During 2012, it competed against EADS to provide aircraft support services to the German military. In 2014, the company partnered with Finnish firm Patria to offer MRO services to McDonnell Douglas F/A-18 Hornet operators worldwide. During the 2010s, RUAG performed a major modernisation of the Swiss Air Force's Airbus Helicopters AS332 Super Puma helicopter fleet, and has subsequently promoted this capability for other operators.

During the 2010s, RUAG Aerostructures became a tier-one supplier of aircraft fuselage sections, wing components, flaps, and other elements for both civilian and military aircraft. It is a long-term supplier to aerospace giant Airbus, having delivered in excess of 9,000 Airbus A320 family fuselage sections by January 2020. On 19 December 2019, the two companies concluded a six-year arrangement for RUAG to manufacture the center fuselage section, flooring and side shells of the A320 at a rate of 60 sections per month at its plants in Oberpfaffenhofen, Germany; Eger, Hungary; and Emmen, Switzerland. In addition to its work for Airbus, other customers of RUAG Aerostructures include Boeing, Bombardier Aviation, Dassault Aviation, GE Aviation, Pilatus Aircraft, and Saab AB.

Dornier 228NG

During 2003, RUAG acquired the type certificate for the Dornier 228. In December 2007, RUAG announced its intention to launch a modernized version of the Dornier 228, which it designated as the Dornier 228 Next Generation, or Dornier 228 NG. At the 2008 Berlin Air Show, HAL agreed to supply the first three component sets — fuselage, wings and tail — for €5 million, as a part of an €80 million ($123 million) ten-year contract. Final assembly for the aircraft is performed in Germany; however, most airframe subassemblies, such as the wings, tail and fuselage, are produced by HAL in India. RUAG decided to suspend production of the Dornier 228 NG after the completion of an initial batch of eight aircraft in 2013. In 2014, RUAG and Tata Group signed an agreement for the latter to become a key supplier of the program. Production was restarted in 2015, with deliveries of four per year planned from 2016. the assembly line is reportedly capable of producing a maximum of 12 aircraft per year.

Structure
The RUAG has the following operational divisions:

Aerospace
 RUAG Aerostructures (component manufacturing, aerostructures and recycling with products mainly for the civil market)
 RUAG Space (in Switzerland, Sweden and Austria)
 RUAG Aviation (MRO for civil and military use, producer of the Dornier 228 NG, system solutions)

Defence
 RUAG Ammotec (small arms ammunition up to 12.7 mm for defence, law enforcement, hunting and sport). RUAG is also the original producer of the HG 85. Producing subsidiaries are located in Germany, Hungary, USA and Sweden. The products for the civil market are branded under the names RWS, Geco, Rottweil, Norma and Gyttorp.
 RUAG Defence (Combat and support vehicle maintenance , simulation and training, network enabled operations , cyber security). Production in Switzerland and Germany.

References

External links

 Official site
 RUAG Space AB 
 RUAG Space GmbH 

Military vehicle manufacturers
Firearm manufacturers of Switzerland
Aerospace companies of Switzerland
Defence companies of Switzerland
Companies owned by the federal government of Switzerland
Companies based in Bern
Science and technology in Switzerland
Swiss brands
Ammunition manufacturers